Glen David "Rip" Russell (January 26, 1915 – September 26, 1976) was an infielder in Major League Baseball, playing mainly as a first baseman for two different teams between the  and  seasons. He was born in Los Angeles, California.

Basically a line-drive hitter and a good fielding replacement, Russell entered the majors in 1939 with the Chicago Cubs, playing for them four years (1939–42) before joining the Boston Red Sox (1946–47). His most productive season came during his rookie year, when he posted career-highs in batting average (.273), home runs (9), runs (55), hits (148), extra-base hits (38), RBI (79) and games played (143).

In a six-season career, Russell was a .245 hitter (344-for-1402) with 29 home runs and 192 RBI in 425 games, including 133 runs, 52 doubles, eight triples and four stolen bases.

Russell died in Los Alamitos, California, at the age of 61.

External links

Retrosheet

Boston Red Sox players
Chicago Cubs players
Major League Baseball first basemen
Baseball players from Los Angeles
1915 births
1976 deaths
Burials at Holy Cross Cemetery, Culver City